George W. Hill may refer to:
 George Hill (director) (George William Hill, 1895–1934), American film director and cinematographer
 George William Hill (1838–1914), American astronomer and mathematician
 George W. Hill (pastor) (1916–2003), American Baptist pastor and peace activist
 George William Hill (sculptor) (1861–1934), Canadian sculptor
 George Washington Hill (1884–1946), president of American Tobacco Co.
 George Watts Hill (1901–1993), American banker, hospital administrator and philanthropist

See also
 George W. Hill Correctional Facility, a jail and prison in Delaware County, Pennsylvania
 George Hill (disambiguation)